Osteopilus is a genus of frogs in the family Hylidae. These species have a bony co-ossification on the skull resulting in a casque, hence its name ‘bone-cap’, from osteo- (‘bone’) and the Greek  (‘felt cap’). 
Color varies between uniform brown, brown-gray, or olive with darker markings or marbled with greens, grays or brown, making a distinct pattern. The finger disks are round; the fingers with a reduced webbing; eyes and tympanum are large. 
Their natural range includes the Greater Antilles and the Bahamas, but O. septentrionalis has also been introduced to the Lesser Antilles, Hawaii and Florida (USA).

Species
Eight species are recognized in this genus:

References

External links
  [web application]. 2008. Berkeley, California: Osteopilus. AmphibiaWeb, available at http://amphibiaweb.org/. (Accessed: Apr 24, 2008). 
  taxon Osteopilus at http://www.eol.org.
  Taxon Osteopilus at https://www.itis.gov/index.html. (Accessed: Apr 24, 2008).
  Taxon Osteopilus at http://data.gbif.org/welcome.htm

 
Hylidae
Amphibian genera
Taxa named by Leopold Fitzinger